John Frink (born May 5, 1959) is an American television writer and producer. He has written several episodes of the American animated sitcom The Simpsons, many of which he co-wrote with his former writing partner Don Payne. Frink and Payne started their career in television writing for the short-lived sitcom Hope and Gloria. They wrote their first episode of The Simpsons in 2000, and Frink still works on the show as a writer and executive producer.

Early life and career
Frink was born in 1959 in Whitesboro, New York. A graduate of Emerson College in Boston, Massachusetts, he holds a degree in creative writing. Frink began his career as a writer for several sitcoms together with his writing partner at the time, Don Payne. The two met at UCLA, where Frink was the boss of the Media Laboratory in which Payne worked. Payne has said to the website TheFutonCritic.com that "one day we were both trying to write individually so I said, 'why don't we pool our resources and write together and see what happens?'" In 2006, Payne told the Los Angeles Times that "I hooked up with a writing partner, John Frink, out of college. I wanted to do films. He wanted to do television." The pair reached the agreement that they would pursue a career in the medium that they first got a job offer in—whether it be film or television. They eventually ended up writing for television sitcoms such as Hope and Gloria (1995–1996) and The Brian Benben Show (1998). These sitcoms were short-lived and Payne has deemed them as failures.

Further career

Frink and Payne joined the writing staff of the animated sitcom The Simpsons in 2000 with the season twelve episode "Insane Clown Poppy", which they co-wrote. "Treehouse of Horror XI", another 2000 episode they wrote, was broadcast earlier than "Insane Clown Poppy", but was produced after. Payne said in an interview with TV Squad in 2006 that "My partner and I were actually working on one of a long string of failed sitcoms (and most sitcoms are failed sitcoms!) On the day a show is officially cancelled, it's kind of a tradition for the writing staff to go out to a restaurant, eat a nice meal, and drown their sorrows. On the way there, a writer named Jace Richdale (who had also worked on The Simpsons) told my partner and me that The Simpsons was looking for some writers. He wanted to know if we'd be interested in it, because he would recommend us. My jaw literally dropped. So he contacted the show-runner, a guy named Mike Scully, who read our spec script and met with us, then hired us on."

After a few years of working on The Simpsons together, Frink and Payne's writing partnership ended. They both continued to work on the show, though, and Payne has described their split-up as amicable. The first episode Frink wrote on his own was season fifteen's "Bart-Mangled Banner" (2004). Since the twenty-first season of The Simpsons (2009–2010), he has been credited as an executive producer.

The Simpsons character Professor Frink, a The Nutty Professor-esque scientist, was named after Frink, although the character was introduced before he was hired as a writer on the show.

Awards
Frink has won several awards for his work on The Simpsons. He has also received several award nominations.

Credits

The Simpsons episodes

References

External links
 

1964 births
Living people
American television writers
American male television writers
Emerson College alumni
People from Whitesboro, New York
Screenwriters from New York (state)